General elections were held in Fiji in 1926.

Electoral system
The Legislative Council consisted of 12 official members (eleven civil servants and a British subject not holding public office), seven elected Europeans and two appointed Fijians. The Governor served as President of the Council.

The Europeans were elected from six constituencies; Eastern, Northern, Southern, Suva, Vanua Levu & Taveuni and Western. Voting was restricted to men aged 21 or over who had been born to European parents (or a European father and was able to read, speak and write English) who were British subjects and had been continuously resident in Fiji for 12 months, owning at least £20 of freehold or leasehold property or having an annual income of at least £120, and were not on the public payroll.

Results

Aftermath
Badri Maharaj was nominated as the member representing Indo-Fijians.

Joni Mataitini and Deve Toganivalu were appointed as the Fijian members, despite Toganivalu having finished third behind Epeli Ganilau in the voting by the Great Council of Chiefs.

References

Fiji
1926 in Fiji
Elections in Fiji
1926 elections in the British Empire